Booker Taylor Russell (February 28, 1956 – March 9, 2000) was an American football running back in the National Football League who played for the Oakland Raiders, San Diego Chargers, and Philadelphia Eagles. He played college football for the Texas State Bobcats. He also played in the USFL for the Philadelphia Stars.

He was charged with murdering his wife in 1985.

References

1956 births
2000 deaths
American football running backs
Oakland Raiders players
San Diego Chargers players
Philadelphia Eagles players
Texas State Bobcats football players